In the run-up to the 2026 Hungarian parliamentary election, various organizations carry out opinion polling to gauge voting intention in Hungary. The results of such polls are displayed in this article.

Graphical summary

Coalition polling

Party polling

Poll results

External links 

Hungary
Opinion polling in Hungary